Marko Bašanović (born 26 September 1994) is a Serbian football defender who plays for Železničar Pančevo.

Career
Born in Belgrade, Bašanović is a product of Rad's youth school. He played for Železničar Beograd, Železnik, Lokomotiva Beograd, Sopot and IM Rakovica. In summer 2015 he returned Rad. After a season with Rad, Bašanović moved to Spartak Subotica next year.

References

External links
 
 Marko Bašanović stats at utakmica.rs
 Marko Bašanović at Srbijafudbal

1994 births
Living people
Footballers from Belgrade
Association football defenders
Serbian footballers
Serbian expatriate footballers
FK Železničar Beograd players
FK Železnik players
FK Sopot players
FK Rakovica players
FK Rad players
FK Spartak Subotica players
OFK Bačka players
FK Bežanija players
FK Zvijezda 09 players
FK Zlatibor Čajetina players
Serbian SuperLiga players
Serbian First League players
Premier League of Bosnia and Herzegovina players
Serbian expatriate sportspeople in Bosnia and Herzegovina
Expatriate footballers in Bosnia and Herzegovina